Terron Schaefer is the former acting Executive Vice President and Chief Creative Officer for Saks Fifth Avenue. Before becoming a part of the Saks team, he was the Senior Vice President of marketing for Warner Bros. Worldwide. Schaefer is no longer a buyer representing Saks Fifth Avenue on NBC's Fashion Star, seasons 1 and 2.

References

Brazilian businesspeople
Living people
Year of birth missing (living people)